Donal O'Mathuna is Senior Lecturer in Ethics, Decision-Making & Evidence in the School of Nursing & Human Sciences at Dublin City University, Ireland, and Chair of the Academy of Fellows at the Center for Bioethics and Human Dignity in Chicago.  His research interests include theology, alternative medicine and disaster ethics. He has written or edited several books, including Nanoethics: Big Ethical Issues with Small Technology (2009).

Biography
O'Mathuna grew up in Ireland and graduated from an undergraduate pharmacy program at Trinity College, Dublin. He then earned a PhD in medicinal chemistry at Ohio State University, and then a MA in Theology with an ethics focus from Ashland Theological Seminary. He taught chemistry and theology at Mount Carmel College of Nursing in Columbus. Returning to Ireland in 2003. he teaches ethics, decision-making and evidence at Dublin City University in the School of Nursing and Human Sciences.

With family physician Walt Larimore, O'Mathuna wrote the 2001 book Alternative Medicine: The Christian Handbook. It was described by Publishers Weekly as a book targeted toward Christians who do not have significant experience with alternative therapies. In a review for the Christian Medical Fellowship, physician George Smith called the book "an honest attempt to evaluate alternative medicine, bringing together both faith and science."

O'Mathuna co-edited Commitment and Responsibility in Nursing: A Faith-Based Approach (2004). It was reviewed by Ethics & Medicine: An International Journal of Bioethics and by  Nursing Ethics.

In 2009, O'Mathuna wrote Nanoethics: Big Ethical Issues with Small Technology. It was reviewed in Notre Dame Philosophical Reviews " and Times Higher Education. According to WorldCat, the book is held in 1221 libraries.

Dr. O'Mathuna co-edited Disaster Bioethics: Normative Issues When Nothing is Normal (2014). A report by the Enhancing Learning and Research for Humanitarian Assistance (ELRHA): R2HC Programme identified the book as a new resource in disaster ethics.

Citizens' Assembly

Books
Books by Donal O'Mathuna include:
 Nanoethics: big ethical issues with small technology, Continuum, 2009.
 (with Walt Larimore), Alternative medicine: the Christian handbook, 2001; updated and expanded edition, Zondervan, 2007.
 Croatian translation, 2010.
 Hungarian translation, 2009.
 Spanish translation of 2001 edition.
 Basic questions on healthcare: what should good care include? (BioBasics Series), Kregel, 2004.
 Commitment and responsibility in nursing: a faith-based approach, Dordt College Press, 2003.
 Basic questions on alternative medicine: what is good and what is not? (BioBasics Series), Kregel, 1998.
 Basic questions on suicide and euthanasia: are they ever right? (BioBasics Series), Kregel, 1998.
 Basic questions on end-of-life decisions: how do we know what's right? (BioBasics Series), Kregel, 1998.
 Basic questions on reproductive technology: when is it right to intervene? (BioBasics Series), Kregel, 1998.

References

External links
Official web site at Dublin City University

Year of birth missing (living people)
Living people
Academics of Dublin City University
21st-century Irish writers
Alumni of Trinity College Dublin
Ohio State University Graduate School alumni